This article lists the directors general of the Civil Guard, the national gendarmerie and a law enforcement agency of Spain.

The Director General is the official of the Ministry of the Interior who commands the Civil Guard, and heads the Directorate-General of the Civil Guard.

List

Notes

References

Bibliography 
 
 
 
 
 

1844 establishments in Spain
Civil Guard (Spain)
Law enforcement in Spain
Spanish police officers
Civil Guard (Spain)
Spain law-related lists